"The One That Got Away" is a song co-written and recorded by American country music artist Jake Owen.  It is the ninth single of his career, and was released in May 2012 as the third single from his album Barefoot Blue Jean Night.  Owen wrote the song with Jimmy Ritchey and Dallas Davidson.

Content
"The One That Got Away" is a reminiscence of a former lover during the narrator's teenage years. According to co-writer Dallas Davidson, Owen " started talking about how the girls would come in for the summer. All the local guys down there would make a little summer girlfriend, but then they would leave. They would go back wherever they came from." Davidson also said that he wanted the song to have a "Tom Petty-ish groove".

Critical reception
Billy Dukes of Taste of Country gave it three-and-a-half stars out of five. He thought that the song's release was perfectly timed for summer, and  said that "Owen is becoming more adept at selling the emotion in his music, but he’s not quite at the level of someone like Keith Urban or Kenny Chesney."

Kevin John Coyne of Country Universe gave the song a C grade. Opining " So, “The One that Got Away” is about a summer love that ends when the weather changes.   It's an old story.  It's been done on the beach.   It's been done at the seaside carnival.  It's been done on the farm. It's been done in the fields. It's gotta be done with cleverness. Or distinctiveness. Or sincerity.  This fails on all counts, leaving us with a generic summer song that's as easily forgotten as the love that it documents."

Music video
The music video was directed by Mason Dixon and premiered in late June 2012.

Chart performance
"The One That Got Away" debuted at number 55 on the Billboard Hot Country Songs chart for the week of May 26, 2012. It also debuted at number 93 on the Billboard Hot 100 chart for the week of August 25, 2012. It also debuted at number 97 on the Canadian Hot 100 chart for the week of November 3, 2012. The single reached number 1 on the Country Airplay chart.

Year-end charts

Certifications

References

2012 singles
Jake Owen songs
Songs written by Jake Owen
Songs written by Dallas Davidson
RCA Records Nashville singles
2011 songs
Song recordings produced by Joey Moi
Songs written by Jimmy Ritchey